Calosoma fischeri is a species of ground beetle in the subfamily of Carabinae. It was described by Fischer in 1842.

References

fischeri
Beetles described in 1842